Davina (born Davina Bussey) is an American R&B singer and musician. 

She grew up in Detroit, Michigan, ran her own dance music label Record, and worked as a recording engineer before signing with Loud Records. Her 1997 single "So Good" became the theme song for the film Hoodlum. Raekwon of Wu-Tang Clan and Xzibit each appeared on remixed versions of the song. Her album Best of Both Worlds (1998) reached number 180 on the US Billboard 200 and number 34 on the US Top R&B/Hip-Hop Albums chart. Two of three singles released from the album charted on both the US Billboard Hot 100 and the US Hot R&B/Hip-Hop Songs charts.

Discography

Albums

Singles
 "Build Me Up (Buttercup)", 1984
 "Can't Stop Rockin'", 1984
 "Rock, Shake And Roll", 1986
 "If You're Single", 1987
 "Don't You Want It", 1992
 "Love & Happiness EP", 1993
 "Let Me Be Me", 1993
"So Good", 1997
"Come Over to My Place", 1998
"I Can't Help It", 1998
"Sweet Thang", 2017

References

External links
 
 Loud Records: Davina (archived)

American contemporary R&B singers
American rhythm and blues musicians
Living people
1966 births
American neo soul singers
American house musicians
American hip hop musicians
20th-century American women singers
21st-century American women singers
20th-century American singers
21st-century American singers